Nontron is a commune in the Dordogne department in Nouvelle-Aquitaine in southwestern France.

History
The name Nontron probably derives from the Gallo-Roman personal name Nantironius. Over time, the placename has been spelt Natadun, Nattun, Nantrun and Nontroun, before the current Nontron.

The town was probably founded around 1100 BC and has been invaded or sacked several times, including by Saracens in the eighth century. In the Hundred Years' War, Nontron was besieged several times, sitting on the border between the Kingdom of England and the Kingdom of France. In 1800, after the French Revolution, it became a subprefecture of the department of the Dordogne.

The town's railway station served passengers between 1883 and 1940, continuing to handle freight until 1975. The town is known for producing a type of folding knife, known as the Nontron knife.

Population

See also
Communes of the Dordogne department

References

Lapouge, Herve. Anciennes demures du Périgord.

Communes of Dordogne
Subprefectures in France
Périgord